Narada Smooth Jazz is a 1997 compilation release by Narada.  It peaked at #25 on Billboard's Top Contemporary Jazz Albums in the same year.

Track listing
1.01   "Redwood/Nocturne" – Spencer Brewer – 4:20
1.02   "Gravity" – Jesse Cook – 3:57
1.03   "Dancing With The Bear" – Budi Siebert – 5:06
1.04   "Mil Amores" – Doug Cameron – 6:44
1.05   "Sunday In Alsace" – Friedemann Witecka  – 5:55 (Composed by: Friedemann Witecka and Johannes Wohlleben)
1.06   "Thinking Of You" – Oscar Lopez – 4:18
1.07   "Zuni Rain" – Michael Gettel – 4:02
1.08   "Painted Birds" – Bernardo Rubaja – 4:06  (Composed by: Federico Ramos)
1.09   "Rest Assured" – Randy Roos – 5:10
1.10   "Shall We? (edit)" – Nando Lauria – 3:56
1.11   "La Couronne" – Martin Kolbe – 5:35
1.12   "Just Dreamin" – Richard Souther – 5:10
1.13   "Heart & Beat" – Ralf Illenberger – 4:52
1.14   "Take The High Road" – David Lanz – 2:26
2.01   "Joy of Beltane" – Friedemann Witecka – 3:43 (Composed by: Friedemann Witecka and Emmanuel Séjourné)
2.02   "Blue Rock Road" – Bradley Joseph – 3:13
2.03   "The Beauty Within" – Budi Siebert – 4:33
2.04   "Desperate Love" – Oscar Lopez – 4:04
2.05   St. Tropez" – Doug Cameron – 5:52  (Composed by: Doug Cameron and Chris Boardman)
2.06   "River Run" – Michael Gettel – 7:27
2.07   "Breeze From Saintes Maries" – Jesse Cook – 5:20
2.08   "Dab in Da Mida" – Brian Mann – 3:23
2.09   "Twelve Three" – Randy Roos – 6:08
2.10   "Hazel" – Trapezoid – 4:06  (Composed by: Bob Read)
2.11   "Dancing Kachinas" – Ralf Illenberger – 3:22
2.12   "Monkey Talk" – Spencer Brewer – 3:29
2.13   "Companero" – Richard Souther – 3:55  (Composed by: Eric Persing)
2.14   "If I Fell" – Nando Lauria – 3:37 (Composed by: Lennon–McCartney)

References

External links
Listing at Narada.com
 
 Narada Smooth Jazz at Discogs

1997 compilation albums
Instrumental compilation albums
Smooth jazz compilation albums
Narada Productions compilation albums